Roman Malek (3 October 1951 – 29 November 2019) was a Polish-born German professor and sinologist.

Biography 
Born in Bytów, Polish People's Republic, Malek entered the Society of the Divine Word (SVD) in 1969. He studied philosophy, theology, and comparative religions, completing a doctorate in Sinology (1984) and a Habilitationsschrift on the Chinese theologian Wu Leichuan (2003), both at the University of Bonn. Malek was a professor of philosophy and religious sciences at SVD Saint Augustin University of Philosophy and Theology and a sinology professor at the University of Bonn.

Malek was a prolific scholar, producing more than 970 academic pieces. Malek was also an experienced editor, overseeing the publication of 20 volumes of the journal Monumenta Serica and editing three book series which produced 75 volumes.

In 2018, he moved back to his native Poland and died due to illness on 29 November 2019.

Works
 
 
 

A bibliography of his 970 works can be found in the two-volume festschrift produced in his honor, Rooted in Hope (2017).

References

1951 births
2019 deaths
Religion academics
Christian missions in China
World Christianity scholars
History of Christianity in China
20th-century Polish historians
Polish male non-fiction writers
Polish sinologists
Academic staff of the University of Bonn